Thomas Goad Blain (11 March 1827 – 10 March 1878) was an English cricketer active in the early 1850s, playing in three first-class cricket matches.

Blain made his debut in first-class cricket for a Lancashire XI in 1851 against a Yorkshire XI at the Botanical Gardens in Manchester. The following season he played a further two first-class matches for Manchester against the Marylebone Cricket Club at Lord's and against Sheffield at the Botanical Gardens. He scored a total of 28 runs in his three matches, with a high score of 10.

He died in Chislehurst, Kent on 10 March 1878, a day shy of his 51st birthday.

References

External links
 

1827 births
1878 deaths
Cricketers from Liverpool
English cricketers
Manchester Cricket Club cricketers
People from West Derby